Unechsky District is an administrative and municipal district (raion), one of the twenty-seven in Bryansk Oblast, Russia. It is located in the western central part of the oblast. Its administrative center is the town of Unecha. Population:   46,871 (2002 Census);  The population of Unecha accounts for 70.0% of the district's total population.

References

Notes

Sources

Districts of Bryansk Oblast